Aywick is a small settlement on the east side of Yell, an island forming part of the Shetland Islands north of Scotland.

The naturalist Bobby Tulloch was born and grew up in Aywick.

References

External links

Canmore - Hunter: Stoal, Aywick, Yell, North Sea site record

Villages in Yell, Shetland